As the US Motors and Generators Business Unit of ABB, ABB Motors and Mechanical Inc. markets, designs, manufactures, and provides service for industrial electric motors, generators and mechanical power transmission products. This business was formerly known as Baldor Electric Company until its company name was merged into ABB on March 1, 2018.

The US business unit, headquartered in Fort Smith, Arkansas, oversees 15 manufacturing locations in 8 states.

The company sells Baldor-Reliance and ABB branded industrial electric motors.  Products are available in both IEC and NEMA configurations and range from fractional to 100,000 horsepower.

The company also sells the Dodge brand of mechanical power transmission products, including mounted bearings, enclosed gearing, couplings, sheaves, and bushings.

History 

Baldor Electric was founded in 1920 by Edwin Ballman and Emil Doerr. The name of the company was derived using part of each of their names. In 1967 the Company's headquarters were moved from St. Louis, Missouri to Fort Smith, Arkansas.

In 2007, Baldor Electric acquired the Dodge and Reliance Electric brands from Rockwell Automation for $1.8 billion. This more than doubled the size of the company, taking it from $800 million in annual revenue to $1.8 billion.

In 2011, Baldor was acquired by ABB Ltd of Switzerland in an all-cash deal of US$4.2 billion ($1.1 billion debt included).  The company continued to operate as Baldor Electric Company A Member of the ABB Group.

On March 1, 2018, Baldor Electric Company's name was dissolved into the ABB brand, becoming ABB across all of its locations.

Products

Industrial electric motors 
 ABB and Baldor-Reliance brands
 DC
 AC Induction
 Grinders / Buffers
 DC Servo
 AC Servo
 Variable speed
 Industry specific solutions

Dodge bearings 
 Mounted bearings
 Tapered roller bearings
 Spherical roller bearings
 Sleeve bearings
 Sleeveoil hydrodynamic bearings
 Take up frames

Dodge gear reducers 
 Shaft mount helical
 Helical screw conveyor
 Right angle worm
 Helical inline
 Planetary
 Energy efficient gear motor / reducer

Dodge power transmission components 
 Couplings
 Clutches
 Brakes
 Bushings
 Hubs
 Sheaves
 Pulleys

References

External links 
 Baldor Electric Website
 US ABB Website

Manufacturing companies of the United States
Manufacturing companies established in 1920
Manufacturing companies based in Arkansas
1920 establishments in Missouri
American companies established in 1920

it:Personaggi del Ciclo dell'Eredità#Baldor
pl:Lista Rohirrimów#Baldor